Sudevan (also known as Sudevan P.P.), (born on 2 May 1975), is an Indian filmmaker and script writer based in Kerala, India.

Early life 
He was born and raised in Peringode, Kerala in 1975. He studied at Peringode high school and Sree Neelakanta Govt. Sanskrit College, Pattambi

Career 
Sudevan's directorial debut was an ad about the ‘Ropeway’ in Malampuzha, Kerala. 

In 2004 he made a short film, Varoo (Come with me). This was followed by Planning in 2007 and Randu (Two, 2009), both of which were screened at short film festivals and broadcast by television networks in the region. Thattumporathappan (Lord of the Attic, 2010) is Sudevan's fourth film. It explores the evolution of religious faith and its after-effects, through a tale set in his hometown. 

Sudevan's first feature film CR No: 89 points out the consequences of the percolation of weapons and its effect on smaller societies. This film won seven awards from Kerala. CR No: 89 appeared at Hong Kong International Film Festival (2015), Malaysian Malayalam Film Festival (2015), Colombo International film festival Sri Lanka (2014), Hanoi International Film Festival, Vietnam (2014) and International Film Festival of Kerala in )(2013). 

He made the film Akatho Puratho (In or Out, 2018). The film portrays that Inside or outside is an image of four copies of a transit between greed and excitement to a vacuum.

Filmography

Recognition 

 Netpac award (2013)
 John Abraham National Awards (2014) 
 Aravindan award (2014)
 Padmarajan Award (2014)
 Mohan Raghavan Puraskaram (2014)

References

External links
 

Living people
Malayalam film directors
People from Palakkad district
21st-century Indian film directors
Film directors from Kerala
1975 births